Armando Reyes (28 October 1893 – 7 September 1954) was an Argentine footballer who spent his entire career in  Racing Club, where he stayed from 1911 to 1929. His position on the field was right back.

Reyes was part of the team during the Racing CLub's "golden age" that included 7 consecutive league titles, earning the nickname Academia ("academy") for the club, winning 20 titles with the team.

Internationally, Reyes played a total of 22 matches for the Argentina national football team, being also part of Argentina's squad for the 1919 South American Championship.

Nicknamed El Negro, Reyes was born in Avellaneda and started his career in the fourth division of Racing in 1910, where he played alongside future idols of the club such as Carlos Muttoni, Francisco Olazar, and Ricardo Pepe. His good performances promoted him to the senior squad that same year. Nevertheless, Reyes would leave the senior squad in 1929, joining the veterans team where he stayed until 1929. When he retired from football, Reyes became manager of Racing Club in the early 1930s.

Despite of having played his entire career for Racing Club, Reyes played a friendly match (along with goalkeeper Marcos Crocce) for Gath & Chavez, on 8 October 1918. He also remains as the Racing player with most matches with the Argentina national team, and the most winning player with 20 titles won with the team.

Titles
Racing
 Primera División (8): 1913, 1914, 1915, 1916, 1917, 1918, 1919, 1921
 Copa Honor MCBA (4): 1912, 1913, 1915, 1917
 Copa Ibarguren (5): 1913, 1914, 1916, 1917, 1918
 Copa de Honor Cousenier (1): 1913 
 Copa Aldao (2): 1917, 1918

References

r
r
r
r
r
r
Sportspeople from Avellaneda